Feng Qi (born August 13, 1981 in Shanghai) is a former Chinese football player who spent the majority of his career playing for Shanghai Shenhua as a defender.

Club career
Feng Qi began his professional football career at Shanghai Shenhua after graduating from their youth team during the 2002 league season. While he stayed with Shanghai Shenhua for several seasons he was unable to overtake Sun Ji as the first choice right-back within the team and only made eight league appearances for them, however despite his limited playing time he was still able to win the 2003 league title with the club. Unfortunately in 2013 the Chinese Football Association would revoke the league title after it was discovered the Shenhua General manager Lou Shifang had bribed officials to be bias to Shenhua in games that season. By the 2006 Chinese Super League season he would move to Shanghai United F.C. and help them come 7th within the league.

At the beginning of the 2007 Chinese Super League football league season  Shanghai United F.C. and Shanghai Shenhua merged, with Shanghai Shenhua keeping their name. Feng Qi struggled to be included in the Shanghai Shenhua team and spent the entire 2007 and 2008 league seasons not included in the squad. It was only once the squad was significantly reduced by the 2009 league that saw Feng Qi return to the senior team when he played his first game in several seasons against Shenzhen Asia Travel F.C. on April 17, 2009 in a 4-1 win. His return to the first team did not last long and at the beginning of the 2010 league season he was dropped to second team before he left the club.

Honours
Shanghai Shenhua
Chinese Jia-A League: 2003 (revoked due to match-fixing scandal)

References

External links
Player Profile at Shanghai Shenhua website
Player Profile at sohu.com
Player Profile at football-lineups.com

1981 births
Living people
Chinese footballers
Footballers from Shanghai
Shanghai Shenhua F.C. players
Chinese Super League players
Association football defenders